Mental Vortex is the fourth album by the Swiss thrash metal band Coroner, released on 12 August 1991.

Musical style
Mental Vortex sees Coroner continuing the experimental formula from its predecessor No More Color (1989), showcasing a mixture of thrash metal with progressive, jazz fusion and avant-garde influences, while "unbridled speed and aggression were replaced by highly technical and unconventional songwriting".

Reissues
After being out of print for many years, Noise/BMG reissued the album in 2018, remastered with the same track list in a digipack cd case, with additional photographs of the band and memorabilia.

Track listing

Personnel
Coroner
Ron Broder (as Ron Royce) – vocals, bass
Tommy Vetterli (as Tommy T. Baron) – guitars
Marky Edelmann (as Marquis Marky) – drums, cover concept and design

Additional musicians
Kent Smith – keyboards
Janelle Sadler – backing vocals
Steve Gruden – backing vocals

Production
Tom Morris – producer, engineer, mixing
Sven Conquest – second engineer
Karl-U. Walterbach – executive producer
Martin Becker – photography (cover and sleeve)
Maren Lotz – typography
Robbie Müller – digital image

Notes
The intro on "Divine Step" (the "Emergency Room intro") is from the movie Re-Animator.
Lilith is a female demon of the Mesopotamian mythology.
The sample at the end of "Semtex Revolution" is from a Dallas news broadcast covering the assassination of John F. Kennedy.
Semtex is a type of plastic explosive.
"About Life" samples the line 'We have to see, we have to know' from the film Hellbound: Hellraiser II.
The cover image is a modified photograph of Anthony Perkins as Norman Bates in the 1960 Alfred Hitchcock film Psycho.
A music video was made for the song "I Want You (She's So Heavy)".

References

External links
 BNR Metal Pages' section on Coroner
 Fan page with detailed album information and lyrics
 Coroner at Last.fm

1991 albums
Coroner (band) albums
Noise Records albums